Qaleh Khalifeh or Qaleh-ye Khalifeh may refer to:
 Qaleh Khalifeh, Hamadan

See also
 Khalifeh (disambiguation)